Red Kite is the second solo album from British singer-songwriter and Saint Etienne lead singer Sarah Cracknell.

Reception

At Metacritic, which assigns a weighted average score out of 100 to reviews from mainstream critics, Red Kite received an average score of 78% based on 9 reviews, indicating "generally favorable reviews."

Track listing

Charts

References

2015 albums
Sarah Cracknell albums
Cherry Red Records albums